Marco Silvestri (born 30 April 1999) is an Italian professional footballer who plays as a midfielder for Serie D club Ligorna.

Club career
Formed on Genoa youth system, Silvestri played for Serie D club SC Ligorna 1922 on 2018–19 season.

On 5 August 2019, he joined to Serie C club U.S. Avellino 1912. Us Avellino announces that it has reached a two-year agreement with Silvestri in August 2020.

On 30 September 2021, he returned to Ligorna.

Career statistics

Club

References

External links 
 
 

1999 births
Living people
Footballers from Genoa
Italian footballers
Association football midfielders
Serie C players
Serie D players
Genoa C.F.C. players
U.S. Avellino 1912 players